The seventh and final series of On the Buses originally aired between 26 February 1973 and 20 May 1973, beginning with "Olive's Divorce". The series producer and director was Bryan Izzard. Various people wrote the episodes of this series. Arthur Rudge never appears in this series and Stan Butler only appears until halfway through the series.

Cast
 Reg Varney as Stan Butler
 Bob Grant as Jack Harper
 Anna Karen as Olive Rudge
 Doris Hare as Mabel "Mum" Butler
 Stephen Lewis as Inspector Cyril "Blakey" Blake

Episodes

{|class="wikitable plainrowheaders" style="width:100%; margin:auto;"
|-
! scope="col" style="background:#ff8833;" | Episode No.
! scope="col" style="background:#ff8833;" | Series No.
! scope="col" style="background:#ff8833;" | Title
! scope="col" style="background:#ff8833;" | Written by
! scope="col" style="background:#ff8833;" | Original air date

|}

See also
 1973 in British television

References

External links
Series 7 at the Internet Movie Database

On the Buses
1973 British television seasons